The Rock Creek and Potomac Parkway, informally called the Rock Creek Parkway, is a parkway maintained by the National Park Service as part of Rock Creek Park in Washington, D.C. It runs next to the Potomac River and Rock Creek in a generally north–south direction, carrying four lanes of traffic from the Lincoln Memorial and Arlington Memorial Bridge north to a junction with Beach Drive near Connecticut Avenue at Calvert Street, N.W., just south of the National Zoological Park.

The Parkway was listed on the National Register of Historic Places on May 4, 2005. Built from 1923 to 1936, it is "one of the best-preserved examples of the earliest stage of motor parkway development".

During rush hours, a reversible lane setup is used between Ohio Drive and Connecticut Avenue to permit all lanes to be used for the predominant direction of travel. More specifically, the Parkway is one-way southbound on weekdays from 6:45 a.m. to 9:30 a.m., and one-way northbound from 3:45 p.m. to 6:30 p.m. The Parkway first became one-way during rush hours on Valentine's Day 1938.

Route description

The Parkway has two points of origination on its southern end, one at the traffic circle around the Lincoln Memorial, and the other at the intersection of Ohio Drive and Independence Avenue. The eastern portion of the Lincoln Memorial traffic circle has been closed for several years, and there is no longer any easy access to the northbound parkway from that point.  The Ohio Drive branch is now the main originating branch.  Before the Theodore Roosevelt Bridge (I-66) was built, Constitution Avenue ran to the parkway, with Ohio Drive ending at Constitution Avenue. The parkway's entrance is framed by two monumental statues, Music and Harvest and Aspiration and Literature, which together form a group known as The Arts of Peace. They were designed by James Earle Fraser and erected in 1951.

After passing under the Roosevelt Bridge, the parkway passes the Kennedy Center for Performing Arts, including an at-grade intersection with F Street Northwest north of the building. Prior to the building of the Kennedy Center, New Hampshire Avenue ran to the parkway.  Beyond F Street, the parkway runs past the Watergate building; there it intersects Virginia Avenue, which provides easy access to and from the Potomac River Freeway (I-66).  The Potomac River sweeps to the west at approximately this point; the parkway continues along its rough north–south path and instead parallels the small Potomac tributary of Rock Creek.

Past Virginia Avenue, the parkway has many characteristics of a freeway, most notably limited access by ramp.  The first interchange is with K Street Northwest, lying inside the newer Whitehurst Freeway/Potomac River Freeway interchange. Due to the partial nature of the interchange, some movements are made via Virginia Avenue instead. Just to the west, K Street crosses Rock Creek over the L Street Bridge, with the Whitehurst Freeway overhead and separate side bridges for the ramps to and from the northbound Parkway. After K Street, the parkway crosses Rock Creek, paralleling it to the west for a while.

Pennsylvania Avenue crosses over both the parkway and the creek on a combined bridge, with a single loop ramp from the southbound Parkway to Pennsylvania Avenue eastbound. Just to the north, M Street Northwest also crosses the parkway and creek together, with no access between the roads.

Further north, P Street Northwest crosses the parkway and creek, with ramps from P Street to the parkway both northbound and southbound and from the southbound Parkway to P Street. Just after crossing under P Street, the parkway crosses to the east side of the creek on the Bridge near P Street, and a northbound onramp from P Street merges. It passes under Q Street Northwest's Dumbarton Bridge over the creek with no access.

The Charles C. Glover Bridge carries Massachusetts Avenue over the parkway and creek. Access to and from the south is provided via Waterside Drive, which merges into the parkway at a Y interchange. To the north, Waterside Drive merges back into the parkway, providing for all movements but a southbound offramp. Soon after, the parkway again crosses to the west side of the creek on the Shoreham Hill Bridge.

The end of the parkway is near an intersection with Beach Drive, which continues generally northward along the creek. A left turn from southbound Rock Creek Parkway provides access to Beach Drive from local roads. Just north of Beach Drive, the parkway again splits, with Cathedral Avenue heading northeast next to Beach Drive under the William H. Taft Bridge and Duke Ellington Bridge (Connecticut Avenue and Calvert Street), and the parkway becoming 24th Street Northwest at Calvert Street, with easy access to Connecticut Avenue. Cathedral Avenue is one-way at the same times as the parkway. Beach Drive continues as a two-lane road parallel to Rock Creek, enters a tunnel under a hill, passes the National Zoo, and continues towards Maryland.

Trucks and other commercial vehicles are barred from the parkway.

Major intersections

The entire route is in Washington, D.C. All exits are unnumbered.

Trail

The Rock Creek Park Trail runs along the Parkway from the Lincoln Memorial to Connecticut Avenue, where it continues along Beach Drive to Broad Branch Road. The trail continues north along Beach from Joyce Road to Bingham Drive.

The Shoreline section along the Potomac is the oldest section of the trail, built before 1967.

In 1971, the Park Service set aside a lane of the Parkway north of Virginia Avenue for a week to promote commuting by bicycle. The experiment was a success, but caused traffic jams, so the Park Service paved bridle paths immediately to the west that had existed since the park was founded. The trail was extended in September 1971 to Calvert Street, and then  to Bluff Bridge in 1972.

In 1981-82, the parkway bridge over Rock Creek at L Street was replaced and as part of that project, a separate trail bridge was built. It replaced a narrow section of the existing bridge that then served as part of the bike path.

In 1997, the Shoreline Trail section was repaved and realigned.

See also

References

External links

Rock Creek Park (National Park Service)
Rock Creek Parkway Becomes One-Way Traffic Zone

 
Streets in Washington, D.C.
United States federal parkways
Parks in Washington, D.C.
Rock Creek (Potomac River tributary)
Roads with a reversible lane
Roads on the National Register of Historic Places in Washington, D.C.
Buildings and structures completed in 1936
Historic districts in Washington, D.C.
Historic American Buildings Survey in Washington, D.C.
Historic American Engineering Record in Washington, D.C.
National Park Service areas in Washington, D.C.
Articles containing video clips
Parks on the National Register of Historic Places in Washington, D.C.
Rock Creek Park